Pilori may refer to:

the original French word and device the pillory is named after
Au Pilori, also known as Le Pilori, a collaborationist newspaper published in Occupied France during World War II
A misspelling of Helicobacter pylori (H.Pylori), a common stomach bacteria believed to be linked to some health concerns